The Stadio Dino Manuzzi, officially known as Orogel Stadium Dino Manuzzi for sponsorship reason, is a football stadium in Cesena, Italy.  It is currently the home of Cesena FC. The stadium holds 23,860.

History
The stadium was initially constructed in 1957 but had no seats at the time(sporting only two terraces instead). In 1973, when AC Cesena reached Serie A status, the stadium was greatly expanded and could hold 30,000 spectators. In this version of the stadium, the highest ever attendance was recorded when on 10 February 1974, 35,991 people watched Cesena defeat giants AC Milan. The stadium was called La Fiorita from its construction until 1982, when it became named after former Cesena president Dino Manuzzi.

In 1988, the stadium underwent a complete restructuring were all of the existing stands were demolished and then rebuilt. The new capacity was reduced to 23,860.

As a part of Italy's Euro 2016 bid, the Dino Manuzzi was included and there were plans to invest close to €30m on the stadium. The planned changes included an increase in capacity to over 31,000, new press boxes, VIP lounges and media boxes. This fell through after Euro 2016 was awarded to France.

At the beginning of the 2011–12 season, the pitch was converted to an artificial playing surface, with Cesena becoming the first club to do so. On 13 August 2011, at the end of the Italy - Japan rugby match, fans were allowed to enter the pitch and take a cut out of grass with them. That same summer some further work was carried out on the stadium, including a capacity expansion by 1,000 seats. New chairs were installed. The chairs were a white and black colour and on one terrace they spell out AC Cesena. Two Plexiglas boxes were also installed on the side of the pitch, each holding eight supporters, where the fans can track the progress of the match from just a few meters away.

In 2014,  signed a sponsorship agreement with A.C. Cesena, the tenant of the stadium. The stadium would be called Orogel Stadium – Dino Manuzzi.

References

External links
  

Dino Manuzzi
Dino
A.C. Cesena
Sports venues in Emilia-Romagna
Sports venues completed in 1957
1957 establishments in Italy
UEFA Women's Championship final stadiums